Nepal has mixed healthcare system with both public  sector hospitals and private  sector hospitals. Medical colleges have their own teaching hospitals which provide healthcare at subsidized costs. There are altogether 19 medical colleges in Nepal.  In public sector there are primary health centers, district hospital, provincial hospital and tertiary hospitals. In private sector there are general hospitals as well as super-speciality hospitals.

References

Nepal
Hospitals
Nepal